European Management Review is a quarterly peer-reviewed academic journal published by John Wiley & Sons on behalf of the European Academy of Management. The journal covers a broad range of management topics, publishing both empirical and theoretical articles on organization theory, strategic management, corporate governance, human resource management, and managerial economics, focusing on European management issues. Professors Anna Grandori and Michael Morley are the current Editors-in-Chief of the journal.

Abstracting and indexing 
European Management Review is abstracted and indexed by Current Contents/Social & Behavioral Sciences, Social Sciences Citation Index, Scopus, ProQuest databases, and EBSCO databases. According to the Journal Citation Reports, the journal has a 2021 impact factor of 3.000, ranking it 165th out of 228 journals in the category "Management". Though thus clearly a third-tier journal, the journal remains classified as a second-tier journal in the 2021 Chartered Association of Business Schools Academic Journal Guide ranking.

EMR Best Paper Award 
In 2010, the journal established the EMR Best Paper Award, which is sponsored by Wiley, and presented annually to the authors of two papers published in the journal in the preceding year. The winning authors receive €2,000, and a commemorative certificate.

References

External links 
 
 European Academy of Management

Wiley-Blackwell academic journals
English-language journals
Publications established in 2004
Quarterly journals
Business and management journals